"Bottom of the Bottle" is a song by American rapper Currensy featuring R&B singer August Alsina and rapper Lil Wayne. The song was released on August 28, 2015, by Jet Life Recordings and Atlantic Records as the first single from his eight studio album, Canal Street Confidential (2015).

Background and release
The song premiered on August 27, 2015, and the next day was released for digital download as a single on iTunes. The album, Canal Street Confidential, was released on December 4, 2015. While talking about "Bottom of the Bottle" in an interview with Billboard magazine, Curren$y said;

Critical reception
Uproxx's Beware Bowdon wrote that "Currensy might have his most viable single to date with "Bottom Of The Bottle"", also saying that the song "features all the elements of an actual radio hit". Alex Hudson of Exclaim! praised Alsina's vocals, writing that he has provided a "soulful hook" for the song. BET's Eric Diep wrote that it is a "radio-friendly single that has the potential to get some spins in the near future". Ryan Staskel from Consequence of Sound wrote that the song "showcases the album’s shortcomings with some cringe-worthy lyrics epitomized by Lil’ Wayne".

Music video
The official music video premiered on WorldStarHipHop October 30, 2015 and was uploaded to Currensy's official YouTube account November 2, 2015. August Alsina does not appear in the video.

Commercial performance
"Bottom of the Bottle" is Currensy's highest charting single of his career peaking at 97 on Billboard Hot 100.

Charts

References

2015 singles
2015 songs
August Alsina songs
Lil Wayne songs
Atlantic Records singles
Songs written by Muni Long
Songs written by Lil Wayne